Río Hondo is a barrio in the municipality of Mayagüez, Puerto Rico. Its population in 2010 was 3640.

History
Puerto Rico was ceded by Spain in the aftermath of the Spanish–American War under the terms of the Treaty of Paris of 1898 and became an unincorporated territory of the United States. In 1899, the United States Department of War conducted a census of Puerto Rico finding that the combined population of Río Hondo barrio and Malezas barrio was 1,072.

Features
In 2018, over 65 acres of forest land in Río Hondo barrio were acquired by The Autonomous Municipality of Mayagüez in Puerto Rico, in partnership with a local, non-profit conservation group. The preservation of the Río Hondo Community Forest is managed by the

See also

 List of communities in Puerto Rico

References 

Barrios of Mayagüez, Puerto Rico